Sergio Liani (born 3 August 1943) is a retired Italian hurdler. He competed at the 1968 and 1972 Olympics in the 110 m event, but failed to reach the final.

During his career Liani won four national 110 m titles, in 1970, 1971, 1973 and 1977. He set his personal best (13.6 seconds) in June 1971 in Prague.

Achievements

National titles
He won 7 national championships at individual senior level.
Italian Athletics Championships
100 m hs: 1970, 1971, 1973, 1977
Italian Indoor Athletics Championships
60 m hs: 1970, 1971, 1979

See also
 Italy national athletics team – More caps

References

External links
 

1943 births
Living people
Athletes (track and field) at the 1968 Summer Olympics
Athletes (track and field) at the 1972 Summer Olympics
Italian male hurdlers
Olympic athletes of Italy
Mediterranean Games silver medalists for Italy
Mediterranean Games medalists in athletics
Athletes (track and field) at the 1967 Mediterranean Games
Athletes (track and field) at the 1971 Mediterranean Games
Universiade medalists in athletics (track and field)
Athletes from Rome
Universiade bronze medalists for Italy
Medalists at the 1970 Summer Universiade